Presidential elections were held in Togo on 1 June 2003. The result was a victory for incumbent President Gnassingbé Eyadéma, who won 57.8% of the vote. The opposition Union of Forces for Change released their own results figures, claiming that Emmanuel Bob-Akitani had received 71% of the vote and Eyadéma just 10%.

Results
Gnininvi withdrew his candidacy in May but remained on the ballot paper.

References

Togo
Presidential
Presidential elections in Togo
Election and referendum articles with incomplete results
Togo